Linda Harvey-Wild and Chanda Rubin were the defending champions but they competed with different partners that year, Harvey-Wild with Leila Meskhi and Rubin with Kristie Boogert.

Harvey-Wild and Meskhi lost in the first round to Boogert and Rubin.

Boogert and Rubin lost in the quarter-finals to Vickie Paynter and Nicole Pratt.

Kyoko Nagatsuka and Ai Sugiyama won in the final 2–6, 6–4, 6–2 against Manon Bollegraf and Larisa Neiland.

Seeds
Champion seeds are indicated in bold text while text in italics indicates the round in which those seeds were eliminated.

 Manon Bollegraf /  Larisa Neiland (final)
n/a
 Linda Harvey-Wild /  Leila Meskhi (first round)
 Ginger Helgeson-Nielsen /  Rachel McQuillan (first round)

Draw

External links
 1995 Schweppes Tasmanian International Doubles Draw

Hobart International – Doubles
Dou